Flag algebras are an important computational tool in the field of graph theory which have a wide range of applications in homomorphism density and related topics. Roughly, they formalize the notion of adding and multiplying homomorphism densities and set up a framework to solve graph homomorphism inequalities with computers by reducing them to semidefinite programming problems. Originally introduced by Alexander Razborov in a 2007 paper, the method has since come to solve numerous difficult, previously unresolved graph theoretic questions. These include the  question regarding the region of feasible edge density, triangle density pairs and the maximum number of pentagons in triangle free graphs.

Motivation
The motivation of the theory of flag algebras is credited to John Adrian Bondy and his work on the Caccetta-Haggkvist conjecture, where he illustrated his main ideas via a graph homomorphism flavored proof to Mantel's Theorem. This proof is an adaptation on the traditional proof of Mantel via double counting, except phrased in terms of graph homomorphism densities and shows how much information can be encoded with just density relationships.
Theorem (Mantel): The edge density in a triangle-free graph  is at most . In other words, 
Intuitively,  since a  just consists of two s connected together, and there are 3 ways to label the common vertex among a set of 3 points. In fact, this can be rigorously proven by double counting the number of induced s.

Now, note that  since the probability of choosing two s where the unlabeled vertices coincide is small (to be rigorous, a limit as  should be taken, so  acts as a limit function on a sequence of larger and larger graphs . This idea will be important for the actual definition of flag algebras.)
To finish, apply the Cauchy–Schwarz inequality to get 

Plugging this back into our original relation proves what was hypothesized intuitively. Finally, note that  so

Definition
Fix a collection of forbidden subgraphs  and consider the set of graphs  of -free graphs. Now, define a type of size  to be a graph  with labeled vertices .

First, we define a -flag, a partially labeled graph which will be crucial for the theory of flag algebras:
Definition: A -flag is a pair  where  is an underlying, unlabeled, -free graph, while  defines a labeled graph embedding of  onto the vertices . Denote the set of -flags to be  and the set of -flags of size  to be . As an example,  from the proof of Mantel's Theorem above is a -flag where  is a type of size 1 corresponding to a single vertex.

For -flags  satisfying , we can define the density of the -flags onto the underlying graph  in the following way:

Note that, when embedding  into , where  are -flags, it can be done by first embedding  into a -flag  of size  and then embedding  into , which gives the formula: . Extending this to sets of -flags gives the Chain Rule:

Recall that the previous proof for Mantel's involved linear combinations of terms of the form . Thus, all references to  really refer to the limit functional.

However, using the full space  is wasteful when investigating just limit functionals, since there exist nontrivial relations between densities of certain -flags. In particular, the Chain Rule shows that

is always true. These ideas combine to form the definition for a flag algebra:
It remains to check that the choice of  does not matter for a pair  provided it is large enough (this can be proven with Chain Rule) as well as that if  then , meaning that the operator respects the quotient and thus forms a well-defined algebra on the desired space.

One important result of this definition for the operator is that multiplication is respected on limit functionals. In particular, for a limit functional , the identity  holds true. For example, it was shown that  in our proof for Mantel's, and this result is just a corollary of this statement.

The downward operator
The definition above provides a framework for dealing with -flags, which are partially labeled graphs. However, most of the time, unlabeled graphs, or -flags, are of greatest interest. To get from the former to the latter, define the downward operator.

Extending  linearly to  gives a valid linear map which sends combinations of -flags to combinations of unlabeled ones.

The most important result regarding  is its averaging properties. It can be shown that

Optimization with flag algebras
All linear functionals,  are algebra homomorphisms . Furthermore, by definition,  for any -flag  since  represents a density limit. Thus, say that a homomorphism  is positive if and only if , and let  be the set of positive homomorphisms. One can show that the set of limit functionals  is exactly the set of positive homomorphisms , so it suffices to understand the latter definition of the set.

In order for a linear combination  to yield a valid graph homomorphism inequality, it needs to be nonnegative over all possible linear functionals, which will then imply that it is true for all graphs. With this in mind, define the semantic cone of type , a set  such that

Once again,  is the case of most interest, which corresponds to the case of unlabeled graphs.

Perhaps more non-trivially, any conical combination of squares of elements of  will also yield an element of the semantic cone.

Though one can find squares of flags which sum to nontrivial results manually, it is often simpler to automate the process. In particular, it is possible to adapt the ideas in sum-of-squares optimization for polynomials to flag algebras. Also, define  as the canonical embedding sending  to itself for all . These definitions give rise to the following flag-algebra analogue:
With this theorem, graph homomorphism problems can now be relaxed into semidefinite programming ones which can be solved via computer. For example, Mantel's Theorem can be rephrased as finding the smallest  such that . This new optimization problem can be transformed into a semidefinite-programming problem which is then solvable with standard algorithms.

Generalizations
The method of flag algebras readily generalizes to numerous graph-like constructs. As Razborov wrote in his original paper, flags can be described with finite model theory instead. Instead of graphs, models of some nondegenerate universal first-order theory  with equality in a finite relational signature  with only predicate symbols can be used. A model , which replaces our previous notion of a graph, has ground set , whose elements are called vertices.

Now, defining sub-models and model embeddings in an analogous way to subgraphs and graph embeddings, all of the definitions and theorems above can be nearly directly translated into the language of model theory. The fact that the theory of flag algebras generalizes well means that it can be used not only to solve problems in simple graphs, but also similar constructs such as, but not limited to, directed graphs and hypergraphs.

References 

Graph theory